Robert Cornel Neacșu (born 30 January 2000) is a Romanian professional footballer who plays as a midfielder for Metaloglobus București.

References

External links
 
 

2000 births
Living people
People from Urziceni
Romanian footballers
Association football midfielders
Liga I players
Liga II players
ASC Daco-Getica București players
AFC Turris-Oltul Turnu Măgurele players
CSA Steaua București footballers
FC Metaloglobus București players